Valashid or Velashid may refer to:
 Valashid, Nur
 Valashid, Sari

See also
 Valashed